{{DISPLAYTITLE:C20H26O3}}
The molecular formula C20H26O3 may refer to:

 Crotogoudin
 Cyclotriol
 Estradiol acetate (EA)
 Estradiol 17β-acetate
 Gestadienol
 Kahweol

Molecular formulas